Demuzio is a surname. Notable people with the surname include:

 Deanna Demuzio (1943–2020), American politician, wife of Vince
 Vince Demuzio (1941–2004), American politician